Crus can refer to:
Crus, a subgenus of the fly genus Metopochetus
Crus (lower leg)
Crus, a plural of Cru (wine) 
CRUs, an abbreviation of Civil Resettlement Units 
 Rektorenkonferenz der Schweizer Universitäten (CRUS; English: Rectors' Conference of the Swiss Universities)

Crus (plural crura) can also refer to other anatomical structures that are leg-shaped:
crura of antihelix
crus of cerebrum
crus of clitoris
crus of diaphragm
crus of fornix
crus of heart
crus of penis
crura of the stapes
crura of superficial inguinal ring
a leg-like structure of the little skate, used for locomotion

See also
Cru (disambiguation)